Extensions is an album by jazz pianist McCoy Tyner released on the Blue Note label. It was recorded on February 9, 1970 but not released until January of 1973. It has performances by Tyner with alto saxophonist Gary Bartz, tenor saxophonist Wayne Shorter, bassist Ron Carter, drummer Elvin Jones, and features Alice Coltrane playing harp on three of the four tracks.

Reception
In his AllMusic review Scott Yanow says, "The all-star sextet stretches out on lengthy renditions of four of Tyner's modal originals, and there is strong solo space for the leader and the two saxophonists... Stimulating music".

Reviewing the album for jazz.com, Jared Pauley says, "McCoy Tyner finds himself among elite company on Extensions. Recorded as jazz was entering the fusion period, this is a great example of just how good straight-ahead swing can sound...  This performance matches the superb quality of previous Shorter and Tyner albums where members of the Davis and Coltrane groups recorded together."

Track listing
 "Message from the Nile" - 12:22
 "The Wanderer" - 7:43
 "Survival Blues" - 13:15
 "His Blessings" - 6:50
All compositions written by McCoy Tyner.

Personnel

Musicians
McCoy Tyner – piano
Gary Bartz – alto saxophone
Wayne Shorter – tenor saxophone, soprano saxophone
Ron Carter – bass
Elvin Jones – drums
Alice Coltrane – harp (tracks 1, 3 & 4)

Production
Producer – Duke Pearson
Recorded by – Rudy Van Gelder
Liner notes – André Perry
Cover photography – Clifford Janoff

References

1973 albums
Blue Note Records albums
Post-bop albums
McCoy Tyner albums
Albums recorded at Van Gelder Studio
Albums produced by Francis Wolff